Kodungallur Kunjikkuttan Thampuran (1864 - 1914) also transliterated as Kotungallur Kunhikkuttan Thampuran,  was a Malayalam poet and Sanskrit scholar lived in Kerala, India.  His birth-name was Rama Varma.  He is famous for his single-handed, word-by-word translation of entire Mahabharata within 874 days. He is commonly known as Kerala Vyasa, meaning Vyasa of Kerala.

Birth 
Born on 18 September 1864 (i.e., Malayalam era 1040 Kanni 4.).  His father was Venmani Achhan Nambudiripad and mother was Kunjippilla Thampuratti.  In his childhood he was known by his nickname "Kunjikkuttan".

Life 
His family teacher, Valappil Unni Ashaan was his first teacher.  Later he studied under Moonnaamkoor Godavarma Thampuran.  He learned Tarka Shastra from Vidwan Kunhirama Varman Thampuran and Jyothisha from Valiya Kochunni Thampuran. He started writing poetry in ME 1047. At the age of 16, turned full-time to writing poetry. Started in Sanskrit. Turned to writing poetry in Malayalam under the influence of Venmani Achan and Venmani Mahan. He married Kodungallur Koippalli Pappiyamma at his age of 21.  In ME 1062, at his age of 22, his first book "Kavibharatam" was published. At his age of 39, when Pappiyamma died, he married Thrissur Kizhakke Srambil Kuttipparu Amma.  Later he married Sridevithampuratti of Zamorin family. In 1914 January 22 (i.e. on Makaram 10th of ME 1088), at his age of 49, he died.

Literary movements
Kunjikkuttan Thampuran started two literary movements in Malayalam: Paccha Malayalam  (Pure Malayalam) and Puranetihasa Vivartanam (Translation of Itihasas and Puranas).

Paccha Malayalam Movement
Kunjikkuttan thampuran had too many scholar friends.  Their meeting "Kavi Sammelanam" was also famous.  They started writing poems in pure Malayalam, avoiding the over influence of Sanskrit.  This movement came to be known as "Paccha Malayalam" Movement.

Translations
He collected and studied the old scriptures of India.  He has translated the entire Mahabharata within 874 days. In the Malayalam era of 1068, under the leadership of C.P. Achuta Menon, effort was taken to translate Mahabharata as kilippaattu. Advertisement appeared in the Malayala Manorama daily of ME 1068 Kanni 17. The plan was to finish the translation in five years. Whatever portion Kunhikkuttan Thampuran was assigned, he supposedly finished. But the manuscript was never found.
 
After 8–10 years Katatthanaattu Udayavarman Thampuran started the effort to translate Bharata Manjari by Kshemendra. Kunhikkuttan Thampuran finished Drona Parva. Effort unfinished due to the death of Udayavarman Thampuran. Work finished up to Santi Parva.

Kunhikkuttan Thampuran started translation single handedly on  ME 1079 Metam 25. He planned to translate 50 slokas a day, during one yaama (till 9 o'clock), so that the work can be finished in 4–5 years. As he started translating, speed increased up to 150 slokas in one yaama. Translation completed on ME 1082 Kanni 12 (874 days). This was a metre-by-metre translation. He has been truthful to even broken metres in the original.

Works 
14 in Sanskrit. In Malayalam: 18 poems, 11 Ruupakams, 16 Gathas, 38 Khanda Kaavya, 3 in health, grammar, 18 translations.

 Kavibharatam
 Ambopadesham
 Dakshayaga Satakam
 Nalla Bhasha
 Thuppal Kolampi
 Palulli Charitham
 Madirasi Yathra
 Krithirathna Panchakam
 Kamsan
 Keralam - Onnam Bhagam
 Dronacharyar (incomplete)
 Nalacharitam
 Chandrika
 Santhanagopalam
 Seetha Svayamvaram
 Ganga Vitharanam
 Marthanda Vijayam (incomplete)
 Madusoodana Vijayam
 Ghoshayathra

Poems 
 Ayoddhyakandham
 Athmabodham Pana
 Pattabhishekam Pana
 Doshavicharam Kilippattu
 Radhamadhava Yogam Vanchippattu
 Kodungallur Bhagavati Kurathippattu

Translations 
Mahabharata as Bhasha Bharatam
Bhagavad Gita as Bhasha Bhagavad Gita
Kadambari
 Vikramorvashiyam
 Shukasandesham

External links
 Kunhikkuttan Thampuran - Basic Information
 College by Kerala Government

References 

1868 births
1913 deaths
Writers from Thrissur
Malayalam poets
Malayalam-language writers
Poets from Kerala
Indian male poets
19th-century Indian poets
20th-century Indian poets
19th-century Indian male writers
20th-century Indian male writers